The Life of William Blake, "Pictor Ignotus." With selections from his poems and other writings is a two-volume work on the English painter and poet William Blake, first published in 1863. The first volume is a biography and the second a compilation of Blake's poetry, prose, artwork and illustrated manuscript.

The book was largely written by Alexander Gilchrist, who had spent many years compiling the material and interviewing Blake's surviving friends. However, Gilchrist had left it incomplete at his sudden death from scarlet fever in 1861. The work was published two years later, having been completed by his widow Anne Gilchrist with help from Dante Gabriel Rossetti and William Michael Rossetti.

The book became the first standard text on the Blake, a foundation of the extensive scholarship on his life and work. The original 1863 edition was subtitled "Pictor Ignotus", Latin for "unknown artist", a common phrase used for unattributed artworks. Here it refers to Blake's obscurity at the time. The phrase was taken from the recently published poem of that title by Robert Browning, part of which was used as an epigraph. A second edition was published in 1880; this included additional material and revisions to the earlier transcripts of Blake's work and Gilchrist's bibliographical details. Both are referred as Gilchrist's Blake or Life.

Several of Blake's short poems, such as "The Tyger", were typeset during his lifetime and had become widely known since the author's death in 1827, having been reproduced in commonplace books by William Wordsworth and others; however, the larger corpus of his work remained in relative obscurity.

The second volume, edited and annotated by Dante Gabriel Rossetti, included most of Blake's songs, verse and other poetry, his prose, and letters. These were often the first publication in typeset. The editors sometimes adapted the works during transcription, printing "Tyger" as "Tiger" for the well known example, and largely excluded discussion and republication of the 'Prophetic Books'. The transcriptions included the Poetical Sketches (selections), the Songs of Innocence and of Experience, the Book of Thel, and unpublished poetry from manuscript as "Ideas of Good and Evil". Prose works include the rare Descriptive Catalogue, Blake's description of the paintings exhibited at his solo exhibition in 1809. It includes his analysis of Chaucer's The Canterbury Tales, and an account of his panoramic depiction of the pilgrims leaving London.

The work reproduced many of Blake's illustrations from public and private collections, interspersed throughout the biography and series of plates from his illuminated books. Many of these were engraved by William James Linton. Other designs, commentary and the second edition's cover were provided by Frederic Shields.

Anne Gilchrist appended a memoir of her husband, Alexander, to the second volume.

A review by James Smetham of the first edition was included in the second as an "Essay on Blake". The biography of the second edition was expanded with Blake's letters, obtained in an 1878 sale at Sothebys.

Notes

References

Scholarly Commentary Life of William Blake, ‘Pictor Ignotus’ Rossetti archive. Collections
Online transcript of the 1863 (first) edition of Gilchrist's Life of Blake

Further reading 
 

1863 non-fiction books
1880 non-fiction books
British biographies
Works about William Blake